Sarah Hurwitz is an American speechwriter.  A senior speechwriter for President Barack Obama in 2009 and 2010, and head speechwriter for First Lady Michelle Obama from 2010 to 2017, she was appointed to serve on the United States Holocaust Memorial Council by Barack Obama shortly before he left the White House.

Biography
Hurwitz is from Wayland, Massachusetts. She attended Harvard University and Harvard Law School, and began her career as an intern in Vice President's Al Gore's speechwriting office in 1998. She was Chief Speechwriter for Hillary Clinton's 2008 presidential campaign and Deputy Chief Speechwriter for the Presidential campaigns of Senator John Kerry and General Wesley Clark.

She was offered a job as a senior speechwriter for then-Senator Barack Obama on his presidential campaign days after Clinton conceded. Her first assignment for Michelle Obama was to work with her on her address to the 2008 Democratic National Convention. She also wrote Mrs. Obama's speeches at the 2012 and 2016 Democratic National Conventions. After a couple of years as a senior speechwriter for President Obama, Hurwitz became Chief Speechwriter for First Lady Michelle Obama and also worked on policy issues affecting young women and girls as a senior advisor to the White House Council on Women and Girls. After leaving the White House in 2017, she served as a Fellow at the Institute of Politics at Harvard University.

The Forward included Hurwitz in their Forward 50 list as one of 2016's fifty most influential Jewish-Americans. She was also named to the 2019 Forward 50 List.

Hurwitz' book, Here All Along: Finding Meaning, Spirituality, and a Deeper Connection to Life -- in Judaism (After Finally Choosing to Look There), about her rediscovery of Judaism,  was published by Spiegel & Grau on 3 September 2019. It debuted as the number 1 new release overall in the Jewish Life category on Amazon. Its Kindle edition, which sold less than its hardcover edition, was also the second highest new Kindle seller in the Amazon Jewish Life category as well. The book was named a Finalist for the 2019 National Jewish Book Award in two categories: "Contemporary Jewish Life and Practice" and "Education and Jewish Identity," as well as a Finalist for the Sami Rohr Prize for Jewish Literature.

References

Speechwriters for presidents of the United States
People from Wayland, Massachusetts
Harvard Law School alumni
Jewish American writers
American women non-fiction writers
Obama administration personnel
21st-century American women